Henry Propert Easterday (September 16, 1864 – March 30, 1895) was an American professional baseball player. He played all or part of four seasons in Major League Baseball between 1884 and 1890, primarily as a shortstop.

Easterday began his career with the Philadelphia Keystones of the Union Association during the 1884 season. When the league folded he played in the Southern League in 1885, the Eastern League in 1886, and the International Association in 1887 before rejoining the major leagues with the Kansas City Cowboys of the American Association in 1888. He remained in the AA through 1890 with the Columbus Solons, Philadelphia Athletics, and Louisville Colonels. Easterday then played in the minor leagues until his death in 1895.

Sources

1864 births
1895 deaths
19th-century baseball players
Major League Baseball shortstops
Philadelphia Keystones players
Kansas City Cowboys players
Columbus Solons players
Philadelphia Athletics (AA) players
Louisville Colonels players
Augusta Browns players
Bridgeport Giants players
Buffalo Bisons (minor league) players
Providence Clamdiggers (baseball) players
Harrisburg Ponies players
Scranton Indians players
Johnstown Pirates players
Macon Hornets players
Lynchburg Hill Climbers players
Baseball players from Philadelphia